Wadi Al Helo (literally 'the sweet Valley ') is a village in Sharjah in the United Arab Emirates (UAE).

The settlement is situated in the seasonal watercourse, or wadi, of the same name Wadi Helo.

Many people have died in Wadi Al Helo valley as result of seasonal flooding. The most recent recorded incident was on May 30, 2020, when a one-year-old boy and six-year-old girl both drowned in the Wadi Al Helo tragedy.

References

Populated places in the Emirate of Sharjah